Hum Sab Ajeeb Se Hain (English: We are all weird) is a Pakistani sitcom which began airing from 26 October 2016 on Aaj Entertainment. It stars Hina Dilpazeer who is playing the central character of Behtareen, along with Shabbir Jan as his on-screen husband. The show is directed by Muhammad Iftikhar Iffi. The show is an official adaption of another popular Pakistani sitcom Family Front, which was telecast in the 1990s.

Synopsis 
Behtareen is a mischievous woman who always creates trouble for her husband Hashim, who is a strict businessman. Behtareen has two children, a cunning daughter called Eisha, and a daft-like son Pappu, while her sister-in-law Zohra Jabeen also accompanies them in their weird plans and games.

Cast

Regular Cast

Guest appearance
 Erum Akhtar as Fashion Designer
 Jia Ali as Bemisal
 Fareeda Shabbir as Mrs. Kamal
 Humaira Bano as Rabi
 Haris Waheed as Eisha's love interest
 Saife Hassan as Pappu Bhai's uncle
 Anam Tanveer as Pappu's wife
 Beena Chaudhary as Behtareen's neighbor	
 Khawaja saleem
 Hafeez Ali 
 Saleem Miraj
 Arif Siddiqi
 Mehboob Sultan
 Sharmeen Bano
 Haneef Bachan           
 Neha Laaj
 Tariq Butt as police officer
 Irfan Motiwala
 Shameen Khan as Pappu Bhai's love interest
 Beena Chaudhry

References

Comedy-drama television series
Pakistani television sitcoms
2016 Pakistani television series debuts